Granulina mamanucensis is a species of very small sea snail, a marine gastropod mollusk or micromollusk in the family Granulinidae.

Description

Distribution
This marine species occurs off the Fiji Islands

References

 Wakefield, A. & McCleery, T., 2004. New species of Granulina and Gibberula (Gastropoda: Cystiscidae) from offshore subtidal habitats and the western Fijian Islands. Novapex 5(2-3): 69-78

Granulinidae
Gastropods described in 2004